Creede is a Statutory Town and the county seat of Mineral County, Colorado, United States. It is the most populous community and the only incorporated municipality within the county. The town population was 257 at the 2020 United States census.

History

Travelers to this area appeared in the early 19th century.  Tom Boggs, a brother-in-law of Kit Carson, farmed at Wagon Wheel Gap in the summer of 1840.  The first silver discovery was made at the Alpha mine in 1869, but the silver could not be extracted at a profit from the complex ores.  Ranchers and homesteaders moved in when stagecoach stations (linking the mining operations over the Divide with the east) were built in the 1870s, but the great "Boom Days" started with the discovery of rich minerals in Willow Creek Canyon in 1889.

Creede was the last silver boom town in Colorado in the 19th century.  The town leapt from a population of 600 in 1889 to more than 10,000 people in December 1891.  The Creede mines operated continuously from 1890 until 1985, and were served by the Denver & Rio Grande Railroad.

The original townsite of Creede was located on East Willow Creek just above its junction with West Willow Creek.  Below Creede were Stringtown, Jimtown, and Amethyst.  The Willow Creek site was soon renamed Creede after Nicholas C. Creede who discovered the Holy Moses Mine. Soon the entire town area from East Willow to Amethyst was called Creede.

While Creede was booming, the capital city of Denver, Colorado was experiencing a reform movement against gambling clubs and saloons.  Numerous owners of gambling houses in Denver relocated to Creede's business district.  One of these was confidence man Jefferson Randolph "Soapy" Smith.  Soapy became the uncrowned king of Creede's criminal underworld, and opened the Orleans Club.  Other famous people in Creede were Robert Ford (the man who killed outlaw Jesse James), Bat Masterson, and William Sidney "Cap" Light (the first deputy sheriff in Creede, and brother-in-law of Soapy Smith).  On June 5, 1892 a fire destroyed most of the business district.  Three days later, on June 8, Ed O'Kelley walked into Robert Ford's makeshift tent-saloon and shot him dead. The town of Creede was incorporated on June 13, 1892. The anti-gambling movement in Denver had ceased, and the Denver businessmen moved back to their former areas of operation.

Creede's boom lasted until 1893, when the Silver Panic hit the silver mining towns in Colorado.  The price of silver plummeted, and most of the silver mines were closed. Creede never became a ghost town, although the boom was over and its population declined.  After 1900, Creede stayed alive by relying increasingly on lead and zinc in the ores. Total production through 1966 was 58 million troy ounces (870 metric tons) of silver, 150 thousand ounces (4.7 metric tons) of gold, 112 thousand metric tons of lead, 34 thousand metric tons of zinc, and 2 million metric tons of copper.

Geography

Creede is located near the headwaters of the Rio Grande, which flows through the San Juan Mountains and the San Luis Valley on its way to New Mexico, Texas, and eventually into the Gulf of Mexico.

The river has played a critical role in the development of farming and ranching in the Valley.  The Rio Grande and its tributary trout streams provide excellent opportunities for fly fishermen and its unspoiled headwaters in the Weminuche Wilderness are a favorite for hikers.

Climate

Demographics

As of the census of 2000, there were 377 people, 181 households, and 106 families residing in the town. The racial makeup of the town was 96.82% White, 1.33% Native American, and 1.86% from two or more races. Hispanic or Latino of any race were 1.59% of the population.

There were 181 households, out of which 19.3% had children under the age of 18 living with them, 46.4% were married couples living together, 8.8% had a female householder with no husband present, and 41.4% were non-families. 33.1% of all households were made up of individuals, and 12.2% had someone living alone who was 65 years of age or older.  The average household size was 2.08 and the average family size was 2.70.

In the town, the population was spread out, with 19.1% under the age of 18, 5.0% from 18 to 24, 26.3% from 25 to 44, 33.7% from 45 to 64, and 15.9% who were 65 years of age or older.  The median age was 45 years. For every 100 females, there were 100.5 males.  For every 100 females age 18 and over, there were 98.1 males.

The median income for a household in the town was $30,893, and the median income for a family was $34,125. Males had a median income of $27,250 versus $17,250 for females. The per capita income for the town was $21,801.  About 12.2% of families and 13.4% of the population were below the poverty line, including 31.0% of those under age 18 and 11.1% of those age 65 or over.

Arts and culture

The Creede Fork, also known as the World's Largest Fork, is a 40-foot aluminum sculpture and roadside attraction in Creede built in 2012. It is the largest fork in the United States, beating out the 35-foot-long fork in Missouri that previously held the record. In January 2018, it was named by The Daily Meal as the weirdest tourist attraction in Colorado.

The fork was commissioned by Keith Siddel as a birthday present for his wife, Denise Dutwiler, owner of the local Cascada Bar & Grill. Siddel hired two local artists, Chev and Ted Yund, to create the structure. The fork was designed specifically to out-measure the Giant Fork in Springfield, Missouri, which previously held the record of being the longest fork in the United States at a length of 35 feet.

The Creede Repertory Theatre was founded in 1966 and features plays.

In popular culture

Poet and journalist Cy Warman wrote two poems about Creede, Creede and The Rise and Fall of Creede.

The gambler Poker Alice lived for a time in Creede as well as several other locations in Colorado.

In the 1976 film The Shootist, terminally ill gun fighter J.B. Books (portrayed by John Wayne) relates that he had just seen a "sawbones" (slang for a doctor or surgeon) in Creede when questioned about his symptoms.
 
The final scene in the 2007 drama The Assassination of Jesse James by the Coward Robert Ford (as well as the real-life event it depicts) takes place in a saloon in Creede, where Robert Ford is gunned down by Edward O'Kelley 10 years after Ford killed Jesse James. The scene itself was shot on a $1 million set in Alberta that recreated much of 19th century Creede.

Scenes from the 2013 action Western film Lone Ranger were filmed in locations in and around Creede. The train scene was filmed on trains belonging to Creede Railroad Company.

The 2017 Netflix drama Godless takes place partly in Creede. It is the site of a train robbery, after which the entire town is massacred by the criminal gang responsible.

See also

 List of municipalities in Colorado

References

Further reading

External links

 
 CDOT map of the City of Creede

Towns in Mineral County, Colorado
County seats in Colorado
Mining communities in Colorado
San Juan Mountains (Colorado)
Towns in Colorado
1892 establishments in Colorado
Roadside attractions in Colorado